Irving J. Joseph (c. 1881 in New York City – March 1943) was an American lawyer and politician from New York.

Life
Joseph was a member of the New York State Assembly (New York Co., 26th D.) in 1909 and 1910.

He was a member of the New York State Senate (20th D.) in 1915 and 1916.

Sources
 Official New York from Cleveland to Hughes by Charles Elliott Fitch (Hurd Publishing Co., New York and Buffalo, 1911, Vol. IV; pg. 357 and 359)
 IRVING J. JOSEPH, 62, EX-STATE SENATOR in NYT on March 27, 1943 (subscription required)

1880s births
1943 deaths
Democratic Party New York (state) state senators
People from Manhattan
Democratic Party members of the New York State Assembly
20th-century American politicians